In the Trap is a 2019 Italian horror film directed by Alessio Liguori.

Cast
Jamie Paul as Philip
David Bailie as Father Andrew
Sonya Cullingford as Catherine
Miriam Galanti as Sonia
Paola Bontempi as Rose
Delena Kidd as the old woman
Jude Forsay as young Philip
Leila Gauntlett as Isidora
Amelia Clay as the next door's girl
Robert Nairne as the Creature

Release
The film premiered at Trieste Science+Fiction Festival on 31 October 2019.

References

External links

2019 films
English-language Italian films
2019 horror films
Italian horror films
Films directed by Alessio Liguori
2010s English-language films
2010s Italian films